In number theory, the numbers of the form x2 + xy + y2 for integer x, y are called the Löschian numbers (or Loeschian numbers). These numbers are named after August Lösch. They are the norms of the Eisenstein integers. They are a set of whole numbers, including zero, and having prime factorization in which all primes congruent to 2 mod 3 have even powers (there is no restriction of primes congruent to 0 or 1 mod 3).

Properties
Every square number is a Löschian number (by setting x or y to 0).
Moreover, every number of the form  for m and x integers is a Löschian number (by setting y=mx).
There are infinitely many Löschian numbers.
Given that odd and even integers are equally numerous, the probability that a Löschian number is odd is 0.75, and the probability that it is even is 0.25. This follows from the fact that  is even only if x and y are both even.
The greatest common divisor and the least common multiple of any two or more Löschian numbers are also Löschian numbers.
The product of two Löschian numbers is always a Löschian number.
The product of a Löschian number and a non-Löschian number is never a Löschian number.

References
 
 

Integer sequences